Cleavage and polyadenylation specificity factor subunit 4 is a protein that in humans is encoded by the CPSF4 gene.

Inhibition of the nuclear export of poly(A)-containing mRNAs caused by the influenza A virus NS1 protein requires its effector domain. The NS1 effector domain functionally interacts with the cellular 30 kDa subunit of cleavage and polyadenylation specific factor 4, an essential component of the 3' end processing machinery of cellular pre-mRNAs. 

In influenza virus-infected cells, the NS1 protein is physically associated with cleavage and polyadenylation specific factor 4, 30kD subunit. Binding of the NS1 protein to the 30 kDa protein in vitro prevents CPSF binding to the RNA substrate and inhibits 3' end cleavage and polyadenylation of host pre-mRNAs. 

Thus the NS1 protein selectively inhibits the nuclear export of cellular, and not viral, mRNAs. Multiple alternatively spliced transcript variants that encode different isoforms have been described for this gene.

References

Further reading

External links